The discography of Garnet Crow,a  Japanese J-pop band, consists of ten studio albums, one extended play, and thirty-one singles.

Garnet Crow released their debut album, First Soundscope: Mizu no Nai Hareta Umi e in 2001 in Japan, where it reached number six. "Mysterious Eyes" was their first single and it went to number twenty. Subsequent singles "Kimi no Uchi ni Tsuku made Zutto Hashitte Yuku", "Futari no Rocket", "Sen Ijō no Kotoba wo Narabete mo...", "Natsu no Maboroshi" and "Flying" reached the top fifty in Japan.

Albums

Studio albums

Compilation albums

Extended plays

Remix albums

Singles

Live DVD

References

Discography
Discographies of Japanese artists
Pop music group discographies